Pršetinci is a settlement in the Slovene Hills in the Municipality of Sveti Tomaž in northeastern Slovenia. The area traditionally belonged to the Styria region and is now included in the Drava Statistical Region.

There is a chapel at the crossroads at the centre of the village, dating to 1885. A chapel-shrine stands in the northern part of the village and was built in 1922.

References

External links
Pršetinci on Geopedia

Populated places in the Municipality of Sveti Tomaž